Floyd Abrams (born in July 9, 1936) is an American attorney at Cahill Gordon & Reindel. He is an expert on constitutional law and has argued in 13 cases before the Supreme Court of the United States.

Abrams represented The New York Times in 1972 during the Pentagon Papers case, Judith Miller in the CIA leak grand jury investigation, Standard & Poor's and Lorillard Tobacco Company. He also argued for Citizens United during the 2010 Supreme Court case.

Early life
Abrams was born in New York City on July 9, 1936, the son of Rae (née Eberlin) and Isadore Abrams. He is of Jewish descent and had a bar mitzvah ceremony. His first cousin is Elliot Abrams, President George W. Bush's deputy national-security advisor. He earned his undergraduate degree from Cornell University in 1956, and after trying to decide between a PhD in American History and law, he decided to obtain his Juris Doctor from Yale Law School in 1960.

While at Cornell, Abrams participated in Reserve Officers' Training Corps and was a first lieutenant in the U.S. Army.

Career
From 1961 to 1963, Abrams clerked for Judge Paul Conway Leahy of the United States District Court for the District of Delaware.  Abrams joined Cahill Gordon & Reindel in 1963 and became a partner in 1970. He was also a Visiting Lecturer at Columbia Law School from 1981 to 1985.

He is the William J. Brennan Jr. visiting Professor at the Columbia University Graduate School of Journalism.

He is a member of the Constitution Project's Liberty and Security Committee and a patron of the Media Legal Defence Initiative.

In August 2021, Abrams was named to the advisory board of American facial recognition company Clearview AI as of counsel.

In 2022, Abrams began hosting a podcast called Speaking Freely.

Personal life 
Abrams lives in New York City with wife Efrat Surasky. Together they have a son, Dan Abrams of ABC, as well as the host of Live PD and Court Cam, and a daughter, Judge Ronnie Abrams of the United States District Court for the Southern District of New York.

In 2008, he played the role of Judge Hall in the movie Nothing but the Truth.

Recognitions 

 Floyd Abrams Presented with Chambers and Partners' Lifetime Achievement Award in 2010

Selected writings
Speaking Freely: Trials of the First Amendment, (Viking Press, 2005) .
Friend of the Court: On the Front Lines with the First Amendment, (Yale University Press, 2013) .

See also
 Clearview AI

References

External links
 
 
 

1936 births
Living people
New York (state) lawyers
American legal scholars
Jewish American attorneys
Columbia Law School faculty
Yale Law School faculty
Cornell University alumni
Yale Law School alumni
Fellows of the American Academy of Arts and Sciences
People associated with Cahill Gordon & Reindel
21st-century American Jews